The Faggin-Nazzi alphabet is an orthographic system proposed to write the Friulian language, named after its creators, Giorgio Faggin and Gianni Nazzi. It was created before the now-standard Friulian orthography developed by Spanish linguist . Today Faggin-Nazzi is rarely used, also because it uses letters typical of Slavic languages, such as č, which are unfamiliar for most Friulians due to dissimilarity from the Italian alphabet. The alphabet consists of the following letters: A, B, C, Č, D, E, F, G, Ǧ (or Ğ), H, I, J, L, M, N, O, P, Q, R, S, Š, T, U, V, X, Z.

Differences from standard orthography
C before E or I in standard orthography is spelled as Z
Ç in standard orthography is spelled as Č 
CJ in standard orthography is spelled as ČH
Z before E or I in standard orthography is spelled as G
The words zâl and za in standard orthography are spelled as ǧâl and ǧa
GJ in standard orthography is spelled as G before E or I, and as ǦH elsewhere
I between vowels in standard orthography is spelled as J
S at the beginning of words and SS in the middle of words in standard orthography are both spelled as Š
The digraph ‘S in standard orthography is spelled as X

See also 
 Friulian language

References

External links
 Short description of the Faggin-Nazzi system (in Italian)

Latin alphabets
Friulian language